Eurydema ornata is a species of shield bug in the family Pentatomidae.

Description
The body has gray or bright red colors, with black markings. Sometimes it shows the red patches coloured white and yellowish-green. This shield bug sucks the sap of plants, especially crucifers (family Brassicaceae), such as cabbage, cress and radish. It may become a parasite that can damage crops. It overwinters as an adult. The nymph is pale yellow and orange with dark brown or black pronotum and markings on the dorsal side of the abdomen.

Distribution
This species occurs in Europe, North Africa, South and East Asia. It prefers open areas with low vegetation.

Gallery

External links

British Bugs
Biolib
Fauna Europaea

Strachiini
Bugs described in 1758
Hemiptera of Europe
Taxa named by Carl Linnaeus